Winslow is a city in Navajo County, Arizona,  United States. According to the 2010 census, the population of the city is 9,655.

History

Winslow was named for either Edward F. Winslow, president of St. Louis and San Francisco Rail Road, which owned half of the old Atlantic and Pacific Railroad, or Tom Winslow, a prospector who lived in the area.

The last Harvey House (La Posada Hotel), designed by Mary Colter, opened in 1930. The hotel closed in 1957 and was used by the Santa Fe Railway for offices. The railroad abandoned La Posada in 1994 and announced plans to tear it down. It was bought and restored by Allan Affeldt and it serves as a hotel.

U.S. Route 66 was originally routed through the city. A contract to build Interstate 40 as a bypass north of Winslow was awarded at the end of 1977. I-40 replaced U.S. Route 66 in Arizona in its entirety.

Winslow achieved national fame in 1972 in the Eagles / Jackson Browne song “Take It Easy” which has the line “standing on a corner in Winslow, Arizona."

Geography and climate
Winslow is at  (35.028482, −110.700782).

Winslow experiences a dry, temperate arid climate (Köppen BWk), with a wide diurnal temperature variation year-round, averaging 32.7ºF (18.2ºC).

Demographics

As of the census of 2000, there were 9,520 people, 2,754 households, and 1,991 families residing in the city. The city's racial makeup was 40.8% White,  28.8% Hispanic or Latino of any race, 23.5% Native American, 13.5% from other races, 5.2% Black or African American, 1.0% Asian, 0.1% Pacific Islander and 4.2% from two or more races.

There were 2,754 households, of which 40.3% had children under the age of 18 living with them, 50.2% were married couples living together, 16.0% had a female householder with no husband present, and 27.7% were non-families. 23.7% of all households were made up of individuals, and 10.1% had someone living alone who was 65 years of age or older. The average household size was 2.86 and the average family size was 3.40.

In the city, the population was spread out, with 29.8% under the age of 18, 11.0% from 18 to 24, 31.1% from 25 to 44, 18.1% from 45 to 64, and 10.0% who were 65 years of age or older. The median age was 31 years. For every 100 females, there were 122.3 males. For every 100 females age 18 and over, there were 134.6 males.

The city's median household income was $29,741, and the median family income was $35,825. Males had a median income of $28,365 versus $20,698 for females. The city's per capita income was $12,340. About 17.5% of families and 20.9% of the population were below the poverty line, including 26.9% of those under age 18 and 16.3% of those age 65 or over.

Education

Winslow is served by the Winslow Unified School District.

The city has three public elementary schools: Bonnie Brennan Elementary School, Jefferson Elementary School, and Washington Elementary School. Winslow Junior High School and Winslow High School serve the city. Winslow also hosts the Little Colorado Campus of Northland Pioneer College.

Transportation

Winslow is served by Winslow-Lindbergh Regional Airport (IATA: INW, ICAO: KINW). Originally constructed by Transcontinental Air Transport, there is no commercial airline service here. The Winslow airport was designed by Charles Lindbergh, who stayed in Winslow during its construction. When it was built, it was the only all-weather airport between Albuquerque, New Mexico and Los Angeles, California.

The city is on BNSF Railway's Southern Transcon route which runs between Los Angeles and Chicago, Illinois. It is also a crew change point for BNSF Railway.  The city also has twice-daily Amtrak service at Winslow (one train eastbound and one westbound).

Hopi Senom Transit provides bus service from Winslow to the Hopi Reservation.

Interstate 40 runs just north of Winslow; the town is on the historic U.S. Route 66.

Main sights

The historic La Posada hotel has been restored.

The nearby Meteor Crater, sometimes known as the Barringer Crater and formerly as the Canyon Diablo crater, is a famous impact crater.

Standin' on the Corner Park is a park featuring murals depicting the "Girl my Lord in a flatbed Ford". Winslow also has an annual Standin' On The Corner street festival, traditionally held the last week of September.

The 9-11 Remembrance Gardens honors those who lost their lives during the September 11 attacks. The memorial was constructed using two beams recovered from the wreckage of the World Trade Center towers in New York City. A large number of citizens donated time and money to the erection of the memorial, which was in place and celebrated on the first anniversary of the event, September 11, 2002.

Historical events
In the era of steam locomotives, Winslow was an important stop on the Atchison, Topeka and Santa Fe Railway for adding water and fuel to trains. Passengers could disembark and have enough time to have a meal during the extended stop. During the 1920s many celebrities chose to come west to Hollywood and when they stopped in Winslow a parade took place. The local newspaper often documented these special events.

Winslow was also home to a roundhouse and maintenance depot for the Santa Fe. When the station at Barstow, California was given the engineering responsibility for newer diesel locomotives, Winslow began its slow decline. Company brass moved out, as did other employees needed for maintenance and repairs.

In 1949 when the Shah of Iran came to America and toured some sights, he chose to come to the Grand Canyon. His plane landed at the Winslow airport and the entourage took land transport to get to the canyon.

In the 1970s, Winslow was chosen as the site of one of ten Decision Information Distribution System radio stations, designed to alert the public of an enemy attack. The system was never implemented and the station was never built.

Media

Radio
 KINO – 1230AM

Notable people
 Erika Alexander, actress
 Brad Carson, former U.S. Under Secretary of the Army and congressman
 Bill Engvall, comedian (not born there; resided there in the early 70s)
 Deb Haaland, First Native American woman elected to congress. Laguna Pueblo Descent, from Winslow, AZ. And 54th United States Secretary of the Interior
 Michael Daly Hawkins, U.S. Attorney for Arizona; U.S. Circuit Judge 9th Circuit
 Nick Hysong, gold medalist in pole vault at the 2000 Summer Olympic Games
 Richard Kleindienst, United States Attorney General under Richard Nixon
 Vernon Lattin (born 1938), president of Brooklyn College
 Paul M. Lally Producer/Director/Writer "Mister Rogers' Neighborhood" (not born there; resided late 50s)
 Tina Mion, artist
 Tommy Singer, a Navajo silversmith who specialized in chip-inlay jewelry
 Jay R. Vargas, Medal of Honor recipient during the Vietnam War

See also
 List of historic properties in Winslow, Arizona
 Homolovi Ruins State Park
 Standin' on the Corner Park

References

External links

 
 Winslow Chamber of Commerce

 
Cities in Navajo County, Arizona
Populated places established in 1900
1900 establishments in Arizona Territory
Cities in Arizona